() is a type of traditional Chinese wedding set of attire categorized under , which was worn by Han Chinese women in Ming and Qing dynasties. The  attire was composed an upper and lower garment following the traditional Chinese  clothing system.

Construction and design 
The  was a in the style of the Ming dynasty  which was typically decorated with Chinese dragons and was used to be worn by the Han Chinese women as a court robe in the Ming dynasty.

See also 

 Traditional Chinese wedding dress
 Fengguan
 Xiapei
 Hanfu
 Ruqun
 Traditional Chinese marriage

Gallery

References 

Chinese traditional clothing
Marriage in Chinese culture
Wedding dresses
Embroidery